Oleg Lotov (born 21 November 1975) is a former Kazakhstan international football defender.

Club career statistics

Last update: 8 November 2012

International matches

Honours 
with Tobol
 Intertoto Cup Winner: 2007
 Kazakhstan League Champion: 2010
 Kazakhstan League Runner-up: 2003, 2005
 Kazakhstan Cup Winner: 2007
 Kazakhstan Cup Runner-up: 2003

with Astana
 Kazakhstan League Champion: 2000
 Kazakhstan Cup Winner: 2000-2001

with Vostok
 Kazakhstan Cup Runner-up: 1996

References

1975 births
Living people
Association football defenders
Kazakhstani footballers
Kazakhstan international footballers
Kazakhstan Premier League players
FC Vostok players
FC Zhenis Astana players
FC Tobol players
FC Shakhter Karagandy players
Footballers at the 1998 Asian Games
Asian Games competitors for Kazakhstan